Toby Mclean (born 31 January 1996) is a professional Australian rules footballer who plays for the Western Bulldogs in the Australian Football League (AFL). He was selected in the 2014 National Draft with pick 26.

In 2014, whilst playing for the Oakleigh Chargers, he won the Morrish Medal, awarded to the best and fairest player in the TAC Cup under 18 football competition, and was named the best on ground in the TAC Cup grand final.

McLean suffered an injury to his anterior cruciate ligament in the 17th round of the 2020 AFL season, causing him to be ruled out of the team for 2021.

Statistics
 Statistics are correct to round 23, 2021

|- style="background-color: #EAEAEA"
! scope="row" style="text-align:center" | 2015
|
| 16 || 4 || 2 || 0 || 28 || 34 || 62 || 18 || 6 || 0.5 || 0.0 || 7.0 || 8.5 || 15.5 || 4.5 || 1.5
|-
| scope=row bgcolor=F0E68C | 2016# 
|
| 16 || 15 || 14 || 11 || 135 || 125 || 260 || 60 || 38 || 0.9 || 0.7 || 9.0 || 8.3 || 17.3 || 4.0 || 2.5
|- style="background-color: #EAEAEA"
! scope="row" style="text-align:center" | 2017
|
| 16 || 19 || 13 || 12 || 179 || 247 || 426 || 60 || 86 || 0.7 || 0.6 || 9.4 || 13.0 || 22.4 || 3.2 || 4.5
|-
| scope="row" style="text-align:center" | 2018
|
| 16 || 22 || 11 || 13 || 233 || 292 || 525 || 85 || 126 || 0.5 || 0.6 || 10.6 || 13.3 || 23.9 || 3.9 || 5.7
|- style="background-color: #EAEAEA"
! scope="row" style="text-align:center" | 2019
|
| 16 || 19 || 14 || 10 || 142 || 156 || 298 || 72 || 62 || 0.7 || 0.5 || 7.5 || 8.2 || 15.7 || 3.8 || 3.2
|-
| scope="row" style="text-align:center" | 2020
|
| 16 || 12 || 6 || 4 || 57 || 108 || 165 || 16 || 45 || 0.5 || 0.3 || 4.8 || 9.0 || 13.8 || 1.3 || 3.8
|- style="background-color: #EAEAEA"
! scope="row" style="text-align:center" | 2021
|
| 16 || 3 || 2 || 2 || 17 || 25 || 42 || 9 || 13 || 0.7 || 0.7 || 5.7 || 8.3 || 14 || 3 || 4.3
|- class="sortbottom"
! colspan=3| Career
! 94
! 62
! 52
! 791
! 987
! 1778
! 320
! 376
! 0.7
! 0.6
! 8.1
! 10.3
! 18.4
! 3.3
! 4.0
|}

Notes

Honours and achievements
AFL
Team
AFL premiership: 2016
TAC Cup
Team
TAC Cup premiers & Best on Ground - Oakleigh Chargers: 2014

References

External links

1996 births
Living people
Australian rules footballers from Victoria (Australia)
Oakleigh Chargers players
Western Bulldogs players
Western Bulldogs Premiership players
One-time VFL/AFL Premiership players